The Spark is a Trotskyist group in the United States aligned internationally with the Lutte Ouvrière tendency.

History 
Spark originated as a "faction" within the Spartacist League that was attracted to the French group Voix Ouvrière's method of propagandizing in the factories. They allied themselves with the Turnerites against the leadership, but left independently before the League expelled the Turnerites late in 1968. This tendency formally organized as "Spark" in 1971, with two locals in Detroit and Baltimore.

The organization began a monthly magazine The Spark in July 1971, which became a biweekly in early 1976. It also produced a variety of newsletters based at local factories, such as the Ford Spark, Eldon Spark etc. Another magazine, Class Struggle, began in 1980.

The movement was wary of becoming too enmeshed in "petty bourgeois" movements - members wished to firmly base themselves in the proletariat. But neither did they completely eschew work in such movements. For instance, referring to the anti-nuclear movement of the late 1970s and early 1980s, they proclaimed "They should participate in its activities when such participation does not detract from their basic activity in the working class. But we must be clear that the building of a revolutionary organization rooted in the working class comes before participation in any petty bourgeoisie movement". In mid-1982 Spark had locals in Baltimore, Detroit, Chicago and New York.

Working Class Party 
Members of the Spark have been active in the Working Class Party. The party originated from a campaign initiated by members of the Spark. The party ran its first candidates in 2014 in Michigan(as independents, as the party did not have ballot access yet). However, a petition drive to get ballot access was successful in 2016. The party fielded two candidates for the House of Representatives and one for the State Board of Education, the latter of which won enough votes to guarantee ballot access. In 2020 the party gained political party status in Maryland.

References

Publications 

The people's democracies: are they socialist states?: the meaning of their present evolution toward a liberation by Voix Ouvriere Detroit, MI: The Spark, 1966
For a Trotskyist Organization in the Working Class Baltimore: The Spark, 1971
The double nature of the mass communist parties Detroit, MI: The Spark, 1976
Workers states or bourgeois?: what determines the class nature of a state? Detroit, MI: The Spark, 1976
Revolutionaries and Trade Union Activity: reprints of articles from the class struggle Detroit, MI: The Spark, 1977

External links 
 Spark's homepage

Internationalist Communist Union
Political parties established in 1971
Politics of Baltimore
Politics of Michigan
Communism in Maryland
Trotskyist organizations in the United States
Communist organizations in the United States